{{Infobox election
| election_name     = 2007 City of Edinburgh Council election
| country           = Scotland
| flag_year         = 
| flag_image        = Flag of Edinburgh.svg
| type              = parliamentary 
| ongoing           = no
| previous_election = 2003 City of Edinburgh Council election
| previous_year     = 2003
| previous_mps      = 
| election_date     =  
| elected_mps       = 
| next_election     = 2012 City of Edinburgh Council election
| next_year         = 2012
| next_mps          = 
| seats_for_election= All 58 seats to Edinburgh City Council
| majority_seats    = 30
| opinion_polls     = 
| turnout           =

| party1            = Scottish Liberal Democrats
| last_election1    = 15 seats, 26.9%
| seats1            = 17
| seats_after1      = 
| seat_change1      = 2
| popular_vote1     = 42,657
| percentage1       = 22.0%
| swing1            = 5.00%

| party2            = Scottish Labour
| last_election2    = {{nowrap|''30 seats, 27.4%}}
| seats2            = 15
| seats_after2      = 
| seat_change2      = 15
| popular_vote2     =44,489| percentage2       = 22.9%| swing2            = 4.5%

|party3         = Scottish National Party
|last_election3 = 
|seats3         = 12
|seat_change3   = 12
|popular_vote3  = 39,431
|percentage3    = 20.3%
|swing3         = 4.7%

|party4         = Scottish Conservatives
|last_election4 = 
|seats4         = 11
|seat_change4   = 1
|popular_vote4  = 42,840
|percentage4    = 22.1%
|swing4         = 2.6%

|party5         = Scottish Greens
|last_election5 = New party
|seats5         = 3
|seat_change5   = 3
|popular_vote5  = 15,959
|percentage5    = 8.2%
|swing5         = 8.2%

| map_image         = City of Edinburgh Council election 2007.svg
| map_size          = 400px
| map_alt           = 
| map               = 
| map_caption       = Map of council wards

| title             = 
| before_election   = 
| before_party      = 
| posttitle         = 
| after_election    = 
| after_party       = 
}}Elections to the City of Edinburgh Council were held on 3 May 2007, the same day as the Scottish Parliament general election. The election was the first one using 17 new wards created as a result of the Local Governance (Scotland) Act 2004, each ward will elect three or four councillors using the single transferable vote system form of proportional representation. The new wards replace 58 single-member wards which used the plurality (first past the post) system of election.

Aggregate results

 

Following the election, a Liberal Democrat-SNP minority administration was formed.

Ward summary

|- class="unsortable" align="centre"
!rowspan=2 align="left"|Ward
! % 
!Seats
! %
!Seats
! %
!Seats
! %
!Seats
! %
!Seats
! %
!Seats
!rowspan=2|Total
|- class="unsortable" align="center"
!colspan=2 | Lib Dem
!colspan=2 | Labour
!colspan=2 | SNP
!colspan=2 | Conservative
!colspan=2 | Green
!colspan=2 | Others
|-
|align="left"|Almond
|36.6
|1
|10.7
|0
|18.2
|1
|28.1
|1
|4.4
|0
|1.2
|0
|3|-
|align="left"|Pentland Hills
|11.4
|0
|19.5
|1
|20.3
|1
|41.7
|1
|4.3
|0
|2.0
|0
|3|-
|align="left"|Drum Brae/Gyle
|44.8
|2
|14.8
|0
|18.4
|1
|16.1
|0
|3.2
|0
|1.6
|0
|3|-
|align="left"|Forth
|17.9
|1
|29.0
|1
|22.7
|1
|20.2
|1
|5.8
|0
|4.4
|0
|4|-
|align="left"|Inverleith
|20.2
|1
|18.2
|1
|13.3
|1
|27.6
|1
|7.5
|0
|11.2
|0
|4|-
|align="left"|Corstorphine/Murrayfield
|37.7
|2
|15.2
|0
|14.9
|0
|25.7
|1
|4.8
|0
|2.7
|0
|3|-
|align="left"|Sighthill/Gorgie
|10.6
|1
|35.3
|2
|30.9
|1
|9.6
|0
|5.7
|0
|6.0
|0
|4|-
|align="left"|Colinton/Fairmilehead
|14.8
|0
|18.7
|1
|14.9
|0
|45.7
|2
|4.2
|0
|0.6
|0
|3|-
|align="left"|Fountainbridge/Craiglockhart
|17.1
|1
|22.6
|1
|18.6
|0
|27.1
|1
|11.2
|0
|2.4
|0
|3|-
|align="left"|Meadows/Morningside
|30.8
|1
|14.0
|1
|10.5
|0
|26.4
|1
|15.2
|1
|1.4
|0
|4|-
|align="left"|City Centre
|19.7
|1
|17.9
|0
|20.3
|1
|20.1
|1
|16.8
|0
|4.4
|0
|3|-
|align="left"|Leith Walk
|19.0
|1
|26.9
|1
|22.3
|1
|9.7
|0
|15.3
|1
|3.4
|0
|4|-
|align="left"|Leith
|21.8
|1
|26.8
|1
|27.4
|1
|7.1
|0
|11.2
|0
|4.2
|0
|3|-
|align="left"|Craigentinny/Duddingston
|10.0
|1
|34.2
|1
|29.2
|1
|14.4
|0
|5.9
|0
|5.0
|0
|3|-
|align="left"|Southside/Newington
|31.0
|1
|18.6
|1
|13.1
|0
|18.5
|1
|14.1
|1
|2.7
|0
|4|-
|align="left"|Liberton/Gilmerton
|14.2
|1
|34.7
|2
|26.0
|1
|14.3
|0
|3.5
|0
|5.1
|0
|4|-
|align="left"|Portobello/Craigmillar
|<span style="color:white">08.3
|1
|30.8
|1
|28.0
|1
|11.0
|0
|6.7
|0
|13.2
|0
|3|- class="unsortable"
!align="left"| Total!22.0
!17
!22.9
!15
!20.3
!12
!22.1
!11
!8.2
!3
!4.5
!0
!58'''
|-
|}

Ward results

Almond

Pentland Hills

Drum Brae/Gyle

Forth

Inverleith

Corstorphine/Murrayfield

Sighthill/Gorgie

Colinton/Fairmilehead

Fountainbridge/Craiglockhart

Meadows/Morningside

City Centre

Leith Walk

Leith

Craigentinny/Duddingston

Southside/Newington

Liberton/Gilmerton

Portobello/Craigmillar

2007-2011 by-elections 
A by-election arose following the death of Labour Cllr Elizabeth Maginnis on 7 September 2008. The seat was held by Labour's Cammy Day

A by-election arose following the resignation of Ian Murray after his election as an MP on 6 May 2010. The seat was held by Labour's Bill Cook on 9 September 2010.

A by-election arose following the resignation of SNP Cllr David Beckett on 9 June 2011. The seat was held by the SNP's Alasdair Rankin on 18 August 2011.

Changes since 2007 Election
†Forth Cllr Elaine Morris defected from the Liberal Democrats to the Scottish National Party on 21 July 2011.

See also
 2012 City of Edinburgh Council election

References

External links 
 Council homepage

2007
2007 Scottish local elections
2000s in Edinburgh